NICRA may refer to:

Northern Ireland Civil Rights Association 
National Initiative on Climate Resilient Agriculture, India
Nickel-chromium alloy, properly NiCrA
 Negotiated Indirect Cost Rate Agreement (NICRA).  The United States federal government agreement with nonprofit organizations and similar organizations for the rate at which it will reimburse indirect costs.